The following is a list of coaches who have coached the Essendon Football Club at a game of Australian rules football in the Australian Football League (AFL), formerly the VFL.
Key: 
 C = Coached
 W = Won
 L = Lost
 D = Drew
 * = Caretaker coach

References

Essendon Football Club coaches

Essendon Football Club
Essendon Football Club coaches